The Students' Society of McGill University (SSMU) is the accredited representative of the undergraduate student body at the downtown campus of McGill University.

Membership
The SSMU is composed of all undergraduate students studying in faculties based out of the Downtown Campus, with the exception of students enrolled in the Centre for Continuing Education. Students studying in the Faculty of Agricultural and Environmental Sciences at the Macdonald Campus are represented by the Macdonald Campus Students' Society (MCSS).

Governance

Council
SSMU Council is the legislative governing body of the Society. It is composed of elected representatives from the undergraduate student faculty associations, in addition to representatives from the First Year Council,  McGill Varsity Council, Inter-Residence Council, clubs and services representatives (3) and student senator representatives (3). The SSMU Council is empowered to make all decisions on behalf of the Society and also ratifies the actions of the executive committee among other committees of council. Its meetings are held on alternating Thursdays in the Lev Bukhman Room in the William Shatner University Centre, at 6 pm from mid-September to April.

Executive

The SSMU Executive is elected by every undergraduate student at the Downtown Campus of McGill University in an election held every year around March or early April. The Executive is empowered to make decisions on behalf of the Society in between meetings of the Legislative Council. Executives take limited course loads and work full-time hours for the SSMU. The Students' Society President is automatically chosen as the Students' Society's representative on the University Board of Governors.

Board of Directors

The Board of Directors is the SSMU's highest governing body, supervising the management and administering the business and affairs of the Society. It is composed of 12 voting Directors and a non-voting International Representative. Generally, four Directors are appointed to the Board from the SSMU Executive, 4 Directors are elected from the SSMU Legislative Council, and 4 Directors are appointed as Members-at-Large by the Board's Nominating Committee. The Board of Directors administers a number of the SSMU's policies, including its Conflict of Interest Policy, and ensures that the Executives are being held accountable to their fiduciary responsibilities.

General Assembly and Referendum
In addition to the SSMU Legislative Council and Executive Committee, a Fall and Winter general assembly and referendum period are held to adopt changes on behalf the society. General assemblies and referendums are open to the entire membership of the SSMU and referendums are the only mechanism for increasing student fees.

Representation
The society was a founding member of the Canadian Alliance of Students Associations which represented them federally until November 3, 2005 when the SSMU Council voted unanimously to withdraw their membership in CASA, citing CASA's inability to reform, and the absence of CASA from the nationwide 2005 campaign for a $4.9 Billion Dedicated Transfer for Post Secondary Education. Provincially the SSMU is not a member of any association or formal group. In a referendum vote ending November 8, 2006, the membership of SSMU voted to end its membership in the Fédération étudiante universitaire du Québec (FEUQ).

In November 2006, just over one year after leaving CASA, SSMU Council voted to take out prospective membership in the Canadian Federation of Students. After a full year of prospective membership, when a referendum on joining was meant to occur, other member locals of the Canadian Federation of Students voted against extending SSMU's prospective membership.

The SSMU is a founding member of the Table de concertation étudiante du Québec or Quebec Student Roundtable, a new provincial student group that is noted for its lack of membership fee or student levy.

Clubs and Services
The SSMU funds a variety of cultural, ethnic, academic, and social clubs and services. Of the over 200 clubs, dating back almost 100 years, the McGill Debating Union earns notoriety for some of its famous alumni, including singer and poet Leonard Cohen and author of the first draft of the Universal Declaration on Human Rights John Peters Humphrey. A sampling of the SSMU's services and clubs include Divest McGill, the Black Students' Network, Queer McGill, McGill First Aid Clinic, McGill Nightline, DriveSafe, TVMcGill, The Midnight Kitchen, and Players' Theatre.

In addition, the SSMU funds Elections McGill, the independent body that runs SSMU Executive and student Senator elections. Elections McGill was one of the first Campus election organizations in Canada to use an online voting system.

Building
The SSMU leases and runs events out of the William Shatner University Centre building, renamed after the Star Trek hero in 1992 by a referendum vote. As the Shatner building is leased by the SSMU and belongs to the University, the new name remains unrecognized and the building is referred to as the University Centre by McGill administrators. The Shatner building includes offices, a ballroom, cafeteria space, and Gerts, the SSMU's student-run bar. From September 2018 to February 2022, the William Shatner University Centre building closed for renovations. SSMU offices are currently located at 3471 Peel Street and 680 Sherbrooke Street West.

History

SSMU was predated by the Alma Mater Society, which was in 1902-1903. The Society, however, had little responsibility and resources. SSMU was founded in 1908 by the McGill Debating Union. It was recognized as students' official representative body in the following year.

McGill University began its existence with the Faculty of Medicine in 1829 and the Faculty of Arts in 1843. However, not until the beginning of the 1900s was there an association on campus to provide representation and social events for students. Before this time there were no dances, no debating societies, and no government lobbying organizations. The demands for such an organization began to increase with the growth of student-led activities at the turn of the century.

In 1902-1903, the Alma Mater Society was born. Although it promoted activities and some publications, the Society had little responsibility and even less money. It was in 1908 that the Students' Society of McGill University was born. The following year, it was recognized as the single representative body for students at McGill.

The Society was first established in order to coordinate the undergraduate activities of the university. In the words of John T. Hackett, the first President of the Students' Society: "Like most new forms of Government its 'raison d'être' was found in abuses. The students had been brought into disrepute with the public. Their failure to meet their creditors in undergraduate enterprises, and their apparent acquiescence in the charges of vandalism which were periodically brought against them, rendered absolute the necessity of reform." The solution was the Students' Society and its executive body, the Students' Executive Council.

Although McGill University began to admit its first female students in 1884, women were not members of the SSMU until 1931. They had a parallel organization called the Women's Union. In 1965, SSMU had its first female president; Sharon Sholzberg.

Following the founding congress of UGEQ in November 1964, the SSMU executive voted to leave the Canadian Union of Students and join UGEQ in late 1965. Two referendums to join UGEQ were defeated over the 1965-66 university year. In early 1967, SSMU finally joined UGEQ in a successful referendum. The move was deemed controversial among some English Canadians who saw UGEQ as a radical, separatist student union. The 1966-67 CUS President, Doug Ward, encouraged McGill students to join UGEQ since CUS no longer had any other members in Quebec.

The SSMU grew and evolved after its inception. Its role expanded to include several clubs, to offer services, and to care for the University Centre (consisting at the time of a pub and a cafeteria). As enrollment increased throughout the century, so did students' demands. The association took steps to ensure its effectiveness. This included enlarging its Executive Council and creating new positions for students. As social issues on campus became more important and more complex, the SSMU demanded the right to represent students to the university administration. After many student protests, it finally got the opportunity to do so in 1968, by obtaining seats on the Board of Governors and the Senate.

Name Change
On October 21, 2010, at a bi-annual General Assembly, members of the SSMU voted to refer to the SSMU as the "Students' Society of the Educational Institute Roughly Bounded by Peel, Penfield, University, Sherbrooke and Mac Campus" or "SSTEIRBBPPUSAMC" for short. This name change was a satirical response to administrative pressures regarding the usage of "McGill University" in the title of student clubs and services due to liability concerns (e.g., TV McGill).

Controversies

2006 Blood Drive Controversy
On November 2, 2006, SSMU decided to not allow blood drives to be held on their property due to the belief that Héma-Québec's lifetime ban against donations from men who have had sex with other men is in violation of the Student Society's constitution . In the Winter 2007 referendum period, students voted on whether or not to uphold the ban on blood drives. However, before the results could be announced, the Judicial Board (the appellate body of SSMU) issued an injunction sealing the results until they could rule on the constitutionality of the question being asked. The Judicial Board subsequently ruled that blood drives were unconstitutional, nullifying the results of the unsealed referendum. The unsealed referendum revealed more than two-thirds of students supported holding blood drives in the student building.

Choose Life club exclusion
The Students' Society Legislative Council narrowly passed a two-thirds secret ballot motion 16-7 in November 2009, setting a precedent and suspending the club status of controversial SSMU club Choose Life. The motion was the second of two Choose Life-related motions put forward that evening, the first of which, had it not failed, would have revoked Choose Life's club status entirely.

'Farnan-gate' Controversy
In October 2013, Brian Farnan, then the VP of Internal Affairs for SSMU, sent out a weekly listserv email which included a doctored GIF image of US President Barack Obama kicking down a door with the caption "honestly midterms, get out of here." Subsequently,  an anonymous complaint was filed with SSMU's equity commission, and Farnan was compelled to publicly apologize for purportedly carrying out the microaggression of perpetuating negative African-American stereotypes. Backlash manifested itself both on campus and beyond as a result of the apology, which gained the attention of national media and was dubbed 'Farnan-gate' by campus media. SSMU's equity policy was heavily criticized and placed under review as a result. In March 2014, SSMU moved to officially rescind its motion mandating Farnan's apology, releasing a statement which acknowledged the "unnecessary and excessively punitive" perception of the apology and stated it had "trivialized racism."

Criticism of Academic Freedom

On November 20, 2020, SSMU published an open letter demanding that McGill overhaul its policy on academic freedom. The letter said that the policy was endangering people of colour and that what speech is acceptable is decided by "the power of whiteness." Several McGill faculty responded in a letter to the Montreal Gazette, noting that students had cultivated a culture of fear at McGill among faculty since allegations of harm, hate, racism and sexism have been leveraged to justify silencing instructors, the retraction of published works, or defamation campaigns. The respondents suggested students use their platform to argue against views they disagree with instead of demanding they be silenced. SSMU's demand that academic freedom be "overhauled" was criticized in the Canadian and international press.

See also
List of Quebec students' associations
McGill Martlets
McGill Redbirds

References

External links

Union for Gender Empowerment Web Site

McGill First Year Committee of Council (FYCC)
McGill Daily
McGill Tribune
TVMcGill
University Site

McGill University
McGill
Quebec students' associations
Student government